Greatest Hits is a greatest hits album by Billy "Crash" Craddock. It was released in 1983 on Capitol Records. It was released on CD in 1989.

Track listing
Sea Cruise
Now That The Feeling's Gone
I Cheated On A Good Woman's Love
If I Could Write A Song As Beautiful As You
I Just Need You For Tonight
Till I Stop Shaking
My Mama Never Heard Me Sing
Hubba Hubba
I Just Had You On My Mind
Love Busted

References

1983 greatest hits albums
Billy "Crash" Craddock compilation albums